Rodenas may refer to:

 Ródenas, a municipality in Teruel, Spain
 Rodenäs, a municipality in Schleswig-Holstein, Germany
 Alejandra Rodenas (born 1963), Argentine lawyer, judge, professor, and politician
 Clementina Ródenas (born 1949), Spanish politician

See also
 Inés Rodena (1905–1985), Cuban writer